Maqsud Shah (1864 - 1930) (Shah Mexsut),  was the Uyghur Jasagh Prince (Qinwang) of the Kumul Khanate in China from 1882 to 1930, he was the final ruler of the Borjigid dynasty.

Background
Maqsud Shah  was the Khan of Kumul from 1882 to 1930, and served as the eleventh generational ruler of the Khanate.

Maqsud's family was descended from Chaghatai Khan and had ruled the area since the time of the Yuan dynasty, though by the 20th century all the other Khanates in Turkestan had disintegrated. Maqsud spoke Turkic in a Chinese accent and often wore Chinese clothing, and also spoke fluent Chinese. He reputedly drank copious amounts of alcohol and did not allow anyone to take pictures of him.

Reign
Maqsud Shah succeeded his uncle Muhammmad Shah in 1882 as ruler of the Kumul Khanate. The Khans were officially vassals of the Qing Dynasty, and every six years were required to visit Beijing to be a servant to the Emperor for a period of 40 days.
Unlike the rest of Xinjiang which was subjected to state-encouraged settlement, the Kumul Khanate was not opened to settlement by Han Chinese. He sent melons as tribute to the Emperor.

Twenty one Begs administered Kumul under the Khan, and he received 1,200 taels in silver from the Xinjiang government after he sent tribute. 

In 1912, the Qing Dynasty was overthrown in the Xinhai Revolution and replaced by the Republic of China, which promptly appointed Yang Zengxin as the new Governor of Xinjiang. Yang was a monarchist and supported the Khanate and as a result the Khanate's status as a vassal was undisturbed. 

When Yang Zengxin was assassinated in 1928, the warlord governor Jin Shuren succeeded him as the governor of Xinjiang, whose period of rule was marked by strife, corruption and ethnic intolerance.

Upon Maqsud Shah's death in 1930 Governor Jin Shuren replaced the Khanate with the three provincial administrative districts of Hami, Yihe, and Yiwu. Maqsud Shah's son and designated heir Nasir
was not permitted to succeed him to the throne, and the succeeding events set off the Kumul Rebellion with the assistance of Yulbars Khan, who served as Maqsud's chancellor at court.

References

20th century in Xinjiang
Uyghurs
1930 deaths
1864 births